Ghiroda Nouă (also Erzsébetpuszta) is a district of Timișoara, located in the eastern part of the city, north of the Bega Canal. Originally called Colonia Crișan, the area was populated around 1750, when there was a rice mill here. It was annexed to Timișoara in 1949.

History 
In 1711, Pasha Hassan had his summer residence here; the residence came into the possession of the Austrians after the siege of 1716. Part of the Austrian army was stationed in Ghiroda under the command of Count Pálffy. During the Josephinian Land Survey under Count Claude Florimond de Mercy (1723–1725) Ghiroda is registered as an inhabited place with a church and 24 houses. Mainly rice and mulberry trees were grown in the so-called Girodaer Hotter. The first Romanian school, one of the first in Romania, opened here in 1774.

References 

Districts of Timișoara